Highs in the Mid-Sixties, Volume 16 (subtitled The Northwest, Part 3) is a compilation album in the Highs in the Mid-Sixties series, featuring recordings that were released in Washington and Oregon. Highs in the Mid-Sixties, Volume 7 and Highs in the Mid-Sixties, Volume 14 are earlier volumes in the series that feature bands from these states.

Release data
This album was released in 1985 as an LP by AIP Records (somewhat out of order, as #AIP-10024).

Notes on the tracks
The album opens with a cover of a classic by Nat Adderley, brother of jazz legend Julian "Cannonball" Adderley.

Track listing

Side 1
 The Raymarks: "Work Song" (Nat Adderley) — rel. 1964
 (Radio Ad) — rel. 1965
 The Unusuals: "I'm Walkin' Babe" (Jay Hamilton)
 Rocky & His Friends: "Riot City" (Park/LaBrache/Gaspard/Denton/Jeff Beals)
 The Dominions: "I Need Her" (The Dominions) — rel. 1967
 The Bumps: "Hey Girl" (Terry Robotham) — rel. 1967
 The Live Five: "Move Over and Let Me Fly" (Steiner/Smith/O'Brien)
 The Express: "You Gotta Understand" (Dennis Maxwell)

Side 2
 The Navarros: "Tomorrow Is Another Day" (M. Pink) — rel. 1967
 The Gentlemen Wild: "You Gotta Leave" (Jay Zilka)
 The Wheel of Fortune: "Before You Leave" (G. Thompson/R. Allen) — rel. 1967
 Pembrook Ltd.: "Sleepy John" (L. Layton/J. Buchanan)
 The City Zu: "Too Much, Too Soon, Too Fast" (Jerry Cole)
 The United Travel Service: "Wind and Stone" (Benjamin Hoff)
 International Brick: "You Should Be So High" (J. Ussery)

Music of Oregon
Pebbles (series) albums
1985 compilation albums
Music of Washington (state)